Cullen's sign is superficial edema and bruising in the subcutaneous fatty tissue around the umbilicus.

It is named for gynecologist Thomas Stephen Cullen (1869–1953), who first described the sign in ruptured ectopic pregnancy in 1916.

This sign takes 24–48 hours to appear and can predict acute pancreatitis, with mortality rising from 8–10% to 40%. It may be accompanied by Grey Turner's sign (bruising of the flank), which may then be indicative of pancreatic necrosis with retroperitoneal or intra-abdominal bleeding.

Causes
Causes include:
 acute pancreatitis, where methemalbumin formed from digested blood tracks around the abdomen from the inflamed pancreas
 bleeding from blunt abdominal trauma
 bleeding from aortic rupture
 bleeding from ruptured ectopic pregnancy

Importance of the sign is on a decline since better diagnostic modalities are now available.

References

External links 

Medical signs
Ectopic pregnancy